718 is the only studio album by American hip hop group Theodore Unit. It was released on August 3, 2004 through Sure Shot Recordings. Recording sessions took place at Audiovision Studios and Circle House Studios in Miami, and Redline Studios and Sound On Sound Studios in New York from the same sessions for The Pretty Toney Album. Production was handled by K-Def, Emile Haynie, Anthony Acid, Cilvaringz, Dirty Dean, D. Prosper, Milestone, Nexus, Self, the Smith Bros., and DJ Skillspinz, with CL, Ghostface Killah and Mike Caruso serving as executive producers. Composed of Ghostface Killah, Trife Da God, Solomon Childs, Shawn Wigs, Kryme Life, Cappadonna and Du-Lilz, it features guest appearances from Bone Crusher, Kline, Method Man and Streetlife.

The album debuted at number 66 on the Top R&B/Hip-Hop Albums and number 38 on the Independent Albums in the United States.

Track listing

Personnel
Dennis "Ghostface Killah" Coles – main artist, vocals (tracks: 1, 3-7, 9, 10, 13, 15), executive producer
Theo "Trife" Bailey – main artist, vocals (tracks: 2-4, 6, 7, 9, 10, 12, 13)
Walbert "Solomon Childs" Dale – main artist, vocals (tracks: 5, 8, 13, 14, 16)
Shawn "Wiggs" Simons – main artist, vocals (tracks: 5, 11, 13, 15)
Anthony "Kryme Life" Jones – main artist, vocals (tracks: 12, 13)
Darryl "Cappadonna" Hill – main artist, vocals (tracks: 13, 15)
Du-Lilz – main artist, vocals (track 13)
Clifford "Method Man" Smith – featured artist, vocals (track 4)
Patrick "Streetlife" Charles – featured artist, vocals (track 4)
Wayne "Bone Crusher" Hardnett – featured artist, vocals (track 8)
Kline – featured artist, vocals (track 15)
Tarik "Cilvaringz" Azzougarh – producer (track 1)
Self – producer (track 4)
Anthony "Acid" Caputo – producer (track 5), mixing & recording (tracks: 2, 5, 8, 10, 12-14, 16)
Dirty Dean – producer (track 6)
Smith Bros. – producer (track 7)
Nexus – producer (track 8)
Derick "Mastermind" Prosper – producer (track 9)
Kevin "K-Def" Hansford – producer (tracks: 10, 13), co-producer (track 9)
Emile Haynie – producer & mixing (tracks: 11, 15)
Antonio "DJ Skillspinz" Biggers – producer (track 14)
Milestone – producer (track 16)
Stephen "Spidey" Glicken – mixing & recording (tracks: 1, 7)
Mike Caruso – executive producer, management
CL – executive producer
Mario Caruso – associate producer
Rok One – art direction
Kaysh Shinn – photography
DJ Phantom – A&R
Jonathan Kaslow – A&R
Walter Free – project coordinator

Charts

References

External links

2004 albums
Ghostface Killah albums
Albums produced by K-Def
Albums produced by Cilvaringz
Albums produced by Emile Haynie